United States Coast Guard Station Point Allerton is a United States Coast Guard station located in Hull, Massachusetts.

The station is a sub-unit of Sector Boston. It traces its roots back to the U.S. Lifesaving Station and the Massachusetts Humane Society.

Gale of 1898

Portland Gale was an intense storm causing many vessels in the area at anchor, and transiting in and out of Boston to be in distress. Point Allerton responded to many of these distressed vessels and thus saved many lives under the lead of Joshua James (1826–1902), Hull's most famous lifesaver, who became the first Keeper of the Pt. Allerton U.S. Life Saving Station, when it opened in 1889.

Joshua James is honored every year at his grave-site on May 23, Joshua James Day, by the Hull Life-Saving Museum and the Point Allerton Station. His house built in 1850 still stands in Hull, Massachusetts and is marked as having been his home.  The Point Allerton station also still stands, but is no longer in use. The Point Allerton station now houses the Hull Life-Saving Museum. In 2003, the Coast Guard created the Joshua James Award to honor the Coast Guard personnel with the most seniority in rescue work and the highest record of achievement. USCGC James (WMSL-754), the fifth National Security Cutter, was named in honor of his life and dedication to saving lives.

See also
List of military installations in Massachusetts

References 

Buildings and structures in Plymouth County, Massachusetts
United States Coast Guard stations
Military installations in Massachusetts
Hull, Massachusetts